Christian High School, part of the Christian Unified Schools of San Diego, is located in El Cajon, California. It offers a college preparatory education, with the goal to "prepare students who are academically and spiritually prepared to be a light in their community and who understand the nature of God, His Word, and the importance of impacting the world for Christ." Christian High was founded by Dr. Timothy and Beverly LaHaye in 1965.

In the first year, 1965–66, the school included grades 9-11.  The school's principal was Guy East, a missionary with Wycliffe bible translators who was from Scott Memorial Baptist Church, the sponsoring church.  He was in the country while on furlough.  The principal from 1966-1972 was Pete Steveson.  During that period, grades 7-8 and 12 were added.  The first graduating class in 1967 included sixteen seniors.  In those early years, the school grew from 32 students to 330 students.  The school began to participate in interscholastic sports with other schools in the area.  Over that time, the school added football, basketball, track, baseball, and cross country.

Sports 
Students compete within the CIF league in 18 different sports.
Current sports include:
Boys': Football, Cross Country, Soccer, Basketball, Baseball, Track, Golf, Tennis, Swim, Wrestling, Volleyball
Girls': Volleyball, Tennis, Cross Country, Soccer, Basketball, Softball, Track, Golf, and Swim

Achievements

1990 Media Player of the Year (Basketball): Tony Clark
 January 7, 1991: CIF Boys Soccer Division IV runner-ups after losing 4-2 to Bishop’s in the CIF Final.
 March 11, 1999: CIF boys basketball division 5 COF champions

Location 
The school campus is located at 2100 Greenfield Drive, El Cajon, CA 92019. The campus is also shared by other related institutions such as Shadow Mountain Community Church  and San Diego Christian College.

Notable alumni
 Tony Clark, Former professional baseball player (Detroit Tigers, Boston Red Sox, New York Mets, New York Yankees, Arizona Diamondbacks, San Diego Padres)
 Josh Cox, Former long-distance runner and American record holder in the 50k
 Jeff Robinson, Former professional baseball player (Detroit Tigers, Baltimore Orioles, Texas Rangers, Pittsburgh Pirates)
 Daniel Jeremiah, NFL Network analyst and former NFL scout

References

External links 
 Official Christian High Website http://christianunified.org/HighSchool.aspx
 Mission and Values of Christian Unified Schools http://christianunified.org/Mission.aspx
 Shadow Mountain Community Church http://shadowmountain.org/
 San Diego Christian College http://www.sdcc.edu/

Private high schools in California
Education in El Cajon, California
1965 establishments in California